Selysia is a genus of the gourd family. A 2011 study based on genetics placed it under the genus Cayaponia.

Species

References

External links 

Cucurbitaceae genera
Cucurbitoideae
Taxa named by Alfred Cogniaux